Clinical endocannabinoid deficiency (CECD) is a medical theory that proposes that a deficiency of endocannabinoids is the underlying pathophysiology of migraines, fibromyalgia, and irritable bowel syndrome. The deficiency may sometimes start in the womb as a result of maternal obesity.

The nature of the syndrome and existence of CECD as a clinically meaningful condition have been called into question.

References 

Syndromes
Cannabis and health